Rear Admiral Thomas Totty (1746 – 2 June 1802) was a Welsh naval officer of the Napoleonic Wars.

Life
Totty was born at Holywell, Flintshire, and was baptised at Holywell parish church on 24 January 1746.  He inherited a large farmhouse in the town of Flint which later became Cornist Hall, from his mother's side. His father was an ironmonger and mine owner and had 21 other children – Thomas was one of 18 who survived infancy (another was his youngest brother Hugh, chaplain to George IV, who died aged 101).

He took his examination for lieutenant in 1766 and so appears to have joined the navy about 1760 (the exam was only open to those of six years' service or more). He was promoted to 1st Lieutenant on 30 April 1775 onboard HMS Mercury, then in Boston harbour during the American Revolutionary War's second week and possibly one of the ships bombarding American positions in the run-up to the battle of Bunker Hill. Totty was appointed Master and Commander on 17 February 1778 and then promoted to Post Captain on 31 January 1782, getting the frigate HMS Sphinx as his first command and then (in 1796)  as his second. HMS Alfred was stationed in the West Indies and with her Totty landed troops at St Lucia and Puerto Rico and in February 1798 captured three French ships.

He rose to rear admiral on 1 January 1801, becoming port admiral at Chatham Dockyard the following month. He sailed from Great Yarmouth to join the Baltic fleet on board , to serve as that fleet's third in command under Hyde Parker and Horatio Nelson (possibly his first service with Nelson). However, the Invincible ran aground off Yarmouth and sank, with more than 400 men lost, though Totty and those of his officers who survived were found not guilty of negligence. One letter written to Totty by Nelson concluded:

Totty was appointed commander of the Leeward Islands Station on 17 November 1801 and set sail for there the following month. Soon after arriving in Martinique he caught yellow fever and died of it at sea on 2 June 1802. He was buried at Portsmouth Garrison Chapel. A memorial was also set up to him by his brother William in the Chapel of St John, St Andrew and St Michael at Westminster Abbey sculpted by John Bacon.

References

1746 births
1802 deaths
Royal Navy rear admirals
People from Holywell, Flintshire
Royal Navy personnel of the American Revolutionary War
Royal Navy personnel of the French Revolutionary Wars
British naval commanders of the Napoleonic Wars
Welsh naval officers